Ben Cleuch is a hill in the Ochil Hills range, part of the Central Lowlands of Scotland. It is the highest point in the range, Clackmannanshire and the Central Belt of Scotland; the summit is marked by a trig point within a stone windshelter and a viewpoint indicator.

Features 
On a clear day, the views are excellent, particularly those to the north looking towards the Southern Highlands. Ben Lomond, Ben Ledi, Stùc a' Chroin and Ben Vorlich are especially prominent. Looking to the south gives excellent views over the Forth Valley region, the Forth bridges and Edinburgh to the east, Glasgow to the west: almost a coast to coast view but not quite.

Geodesy
Ben Cleuch was the origin (meridian) of the 6 inch and 1:2500 Ordnance Survey maps of the counties of Perth and Clackmannan.

Subsidiary SMC Summits

References 

Marilyns of Scotland
Grahams
Mountains and hills of Clackmannanshire
Hills of the Scottish Midland Valley
Highest points of historic Scottish counties